Get together! Get angry! #Resign_ParkGeun-hye candlelight vigil (Korean: 모이자! 분노하자! #내려와라_박근혜 시민 촛불) was the first candlelight vigil held on October 29, 2016, to demand resignation of President Park Geun-hye. This was a vigil that opened the prelude to a total of 20 candlelight vigils, with 30,000 citizens estimated by organizers (12,000 by police estimates) calling for the resignation of President Park.

On October 24, 2016, JTBC reported that they had obtained a tablet PC that seemed to belong to Choi Soon-sil and that it contained the circumstances in which she exchanged presidential speeches that correspond to state secrets. The aftermath of Park Geun-hye–Choi Soon-sil Gate began in earnest the next day when the president Park Geun-hye admitted to her private relationship with Choi Soon-sil through a public apology. The huge shock of the civil society over the state-run manipulation of state affairs began to be expressed soon by the university declaration of the state of affairs and rallies, and on October 29, the first weekend since JTBC's report, a massive candlelight vigil was held in downtown Seoul.

The first rally began with a pre-candlelight rally at Cheonggye Plaza in Jongno-gu, Seoul, with people from all walks of life making critical remarks and declaring the situation. The plan was to leave Cheonggye Plaza and march in procession to Insa-dong. However, during the march, in Jongno 1-ga, citizens broke through the police cordon and headed for Gwanghwamun Plaza to try to go straight to Cheong Wa Dae. Blocked by police barriers in the square, citizens continued their final confrontation with the police, and the official rally ended at 10 p.m. with organizers announcing the end of the rally.

Unlike previous rallies, such as a Minjungchonggwolgi, the demonstration was relatively peaceful. Citizens urged some protesters to refrain from clashes to prevent the protests from turning violent. In order not to provoke the protesters, the police also did broadcast with polite tone and did not send any tools to suppress citizens like the sprinkler truck. The next day, the Seoul Metropolitan Police Agency issued an unusual press release expressing gratitude to citizens for their rational cooperation. Meanwhile, the struggle headquarters announced that candlelight vigils will be held every day at Cheonggye Plaza starting with the rally, and announced next week's rally and a large-scale rally on November 12.

Background 
Since the suspicion of establishing the Mi-r Foundation was first raised by TV Chosun in August 2016, 《The Hankyoreh》 reported on September 20, 2016 that Choi Soon-sil was involved in the process of establishing the Mir Foundation and the K-SPORTS Foundation, sparking media suspicion surrounding Choi Soon-sil. From late September to early October, social scandals such as the 2016 Ewha Womans University scandal, the death of farmer Baek Nam-ki and the request for an autopsy warrant continued, and opposition parties criticized it through regular parliamentary audits. From mid-October, although 'Park Geun-hye–Choi Soon-sil gate' emerged as a key topic as the media such as JTBC, TV Chosun, The Hankyoreh reported the suspicions of corruption in the foundation, Chung Yoo-ra's admission scandal, and the blacklist of cultural and artistic circles in earnest, Park Geun-hye's government flatly denied the basic facts about Park Geun-hye–Choi Soon-sil gate, including suspicions of establishing a foundation or revising speeches.

However, on October 24, 2016, JTBC Newsroom reported that it had obtained a tablet PC containing circumstantial evidence that Choi Soon-sil had received 44 presidential speeches equivalent to state secrets in advance. JTBC's first report, despite only a small fraction of what was on the tablet PC, was "sound enough" to shock Korean society as it turned out to be true that Choi Soon-sil, a civilian, shared presidential documents.

Eventually, at 4 p.m. on October 25, president Park Geun-hye admitted during a public apology at the Cheongwadae's Chunchugwan that "Choi Soon-sil helped in times of trouble in the past" and that "some speeches and others were helped by Choi Soon-sil." However, the president's attitude to explain the situation so far only as "personal connection" did not appear to recognize her heavy responsibility as the head of state affairs, rather fueling suspicions about Park Geun-hye–Choi Soon-sil gate. At around 4:35 p.m., right after the public apology, keywords such as "impeachment," "Park Geun-hye impeachment" or "resignation" were among the top search words on Naver and Daum. Public opinion also deteriorated sharply, and the Realmeter's survey showing president Park Geun-hye's approval rating plunging from 22.7 percent on the 25th to 17.5 percent on the 26th.

Development

Preparation 
The Minjungchonggwolgi(a general rally of the public) struggle headquarters, which will host the first candlelight vigil, was preparing for the sixth protest on Nov. 12, and the official Facebook account of the struggle headquarters had not planned a separate large-scale rally other than the public rally until 26 days ago. However, as the Park Geun-hye–Choi Soon-sil gate intensified, it was announced that the "Citizens' Candlelight Contest" will be held at Cheonggye Plaza at 7 p.m. on October 29 for the first time following the announcement of a small rally on May 26. It is interpreted that the struggle headquarters did not systematically host the rally with plans from the beginning, but that the Minjungchonggwolgi struggle headquarters came to "take on" the hosting of the 1st to 3rd candlelight vigils while already preparing for Minjungchonggwolgi. The official name of the rally was '모이자! 분노하자! 내려와라 박근혜(Get together! Get angry! Resign Park Geun-hye).' The slogan was used until the third candlelight vigil on November 12.

Progression

Protest in the provinces before and after the rally 
On October 29 4:00 p.m., Jeonju in Jeonbuk, bus drivers belonging to the Jeonbuk Bus Worker's Union held a honking protest while driving to show that they agreed to the resignation of Park Geun-hye. A total of 300 buses from Jeonju participated in the protest for about three minutes, and they attached pickets related to the demonstration to guide Jeonju citizens. The honking protest was also a symbol of the pro-democracy movement during the 1987 June Struggle.

In the Yeongnam region, the "Ulsan Organizing Committee of Minjungchonggwolgi", which was formed by the Ulsan headquarters of the Korean Confederation of Trade Unions and affiliated labor unions, began a general rally for Ulsan citizens at the plaza of Taehwagang Station in Nam-gu, Ulsan. An estimated 1,000 people (approximately 800 police officers) participated in the rally. The participants held a rally in the square for about an hour. After leaving Taehwagang Station, they marched through the Ulsan branch of Hyundai Department Store.

Small protest in Seoul before the rally 
In Seoul, some 20 members of a youth organization "21st Century Youth Community Hope" held a "Youth Declaration 1st Action" at the BukInsa Madang in Anguk-dong, Jongno-gu at 2 p.m., issuing a declaration signed by 149 high school students and performing a performance to recreate the president Park Geun-hye's public apology.

The university's declaration of the situation, which had continued until the previous day, continued on the day of the rally. Later in the day, the student council of 10 general graduate schools of Korea University, Dongkuk University, Sogang University, Seoul National University, Yonsei University, Ewha Womans University, Chung-Ang University, KAIST, Hanyang University, and Hongik University held a press conference at Hanyang University to call for the resignation of Park Guen-hye government and strict investigation of the Choi Soon-sil scandal.

Candlelight vigil 
At 6 p.m., a candlelight vigil hosted by the struggle headquarters began at Cheonggye Plaza in Jongno-gu, with thousands of citizens gathering. The rally involved people who came alone, family members, lovers and friends, and even senior citizens who supported the president.

The candlelight vigils were largely composed of condemnation from all walks of life. In opening address, Jeong hyeon-chan, the president of the Catholic Farmers Association, said "Whenever the country was in trouble, we defeated the dictator not by politicians, but by the power of all the people gathered here. President Park Guen-hye should no longer drive the people into a crucible of pain and step down immediately." Then a college student who was taken into custody after shouting for resignation in front of the National Assembly building appeared on the podium and said, "Despite a series of declarations of state of affairs, the president does not seem to know what went wrong. We must impeach the president."

Protest march 
Initially, the struggle headquarters said in a pre-announcement that after the pre-candlelight rally, they will march through Gwanggyo from Cheonggye Plaza to Jonggak-Jongno 2-ga, Insadong-BukInsa Madang, and that the march was also pre-reported like the rally. In response, the police also sent 4,800 police troops from 60 companies to prepare for any eventualities. At 7:10 p.m., when the candlelight vigil was over, organizers and citizens began to march on the streets. An estimated 4,000 citizens shouted slogans calling for the president to step down as they marched out of Cheonggye Plaza to Jongno 2-ga. In the process, the police controlled two lanes of the road.

When they entered Jonggak, the leading participants broke away from the route scheduled for a right turn in front of the Jonggak head office of Young Poong Books and began to go straight toward Jogyesa. The police stopped the demonstrators from marching in the area of Gongpyeong-dong towards Jonggak Station, and the confrontation between citizens and the police began. In response, some citizens tried to turn left and move toward Gwanghwamun, shouting "Let's go to Blue House," and in the process, when the first police line was breached, citizens went out to the Jongno lane. With the police in a hurry to control traffic, protesters broke through the second cordon installed in front of the Kyobo Book Centre and entered Gwanghwamun Plaza around 7:55 p.m.. As police quickly re-installed the third cordon near King Sejong's statue, citizens continued their final confrontation here. Police have also set up bus barricade on both sides of the three-way intersection in front of Gwanghwamun in preparation for the citizens heading individually to Blue House.

Reaction and aftermath

Reactions from all walks of life 
On October 30, the day after the rally, the Seoul Metropolitan Police Agency issued a press release, saying, "The number of participants, including ordinary citizens, increased as they moved out of the notified course and to Gwanghwamun Square during the march, and there were physical fights between some protesters and police in the process of blocking it, but the police responded patiently to the end for the safety of the citizens." And referring to the broadcast by Hong Wan-sun, a police chief of Jongno-gu, they said, "We thank the citizens for following the police's instructions and cooperating rationally."

Meanwhile, Blue House seemed to be paying keen attention to public opinion as it postponed a luncheon for civilian members of the Unification Preparation Committee, which was scheduled to be held by President Park on the eve of the rally. And on the day of the rally, it seemed to keep a close eye on the rally in suspense as the prosecution's seize and search attempt was underway. The next day, Blue House announced its personnel reform plan and accepted the resignations of the Park Guen-hye government's key figures, Woo Byung-woo and Ahn Jong-beom, and secretaries Jeong Ho-seong, Ahn Bong-geun and Lee Jae-man of the so-called "doorknob trio." Analysts said that the reason of putting reorganization of Blue House forward, which was originally expected to be early and late this week, was to come up with quick measures to deal with the political situation, in which public sentiment is rapidly deteriorating to the point where it called for "resignation" and "impeachment".

Analysis 

The press focused on the fact that the rally was not led by certain force, but was voluntarily participated by ordinary citizens, and that it proceeded peacefully unlike previous protests where steel pipes and water cannons appeared. The Kyunghyang Shinmun used the rally participant's expression, "I'm so stressed and angry that my heart is about to burst," as the title of the article, and JTBC also reported the responses of the protesters, "I came out because I couldn't believe it when I saw the news report." The Hankook Ilbo described the protest as a "voluntary citizens' rally across all generations," noting that conservatives in their 50s and 60s, who have been allies of the president Park, voluntarily participated in the protest, while the Dong-A Ilbo also noted that conservative citizens who had no experience in past rallies and demonstrations "participated for the first time in their lives".

Media editorials and foreign media coverage 
On Monday, October 31, newspapers denounced the president's decision, citing weekend rallies in editorials. The JoongAng Ilbo evaluated the rally as "a rally that was rather scary because it was rational," and saw that the rally "was not violent, but the form and content of the protest alone conveyed enough anger and despondency of ordinary citizens."

Foreign media outlets covering the Choi Soon-sil scandal also paid attention to the first candlelight vigil calling for the president to step down. The AP said, "Citizens holding candles participated in the rally with hand signs reading 'Who is the real president' and 'step down Park Guen-hye.' It is the largest anti-government rally in Seoul in recent months. The president Park's lame duck can accelerate."

References 

2016 in South Korea
2016 protests
2016 South Korean political scandal
Park Geun-hye Government
Protests in South Korea